Echmepteryx madagascariensis is a species of scaly-winged barklouse in the family Lepidopsocidae. It is found in Africa, Australia, the Caribbean Sea, Europe and Northern Asia (excluding China), Central America, North America, Oceania, South America, and Southern Asia.

References

Trogiomorpha
Articles created by Qbugbot
Insects described in 1885